A list of rivers of Baden-Württemberg, Germany:

A
Aal
Aalbach
Aalenbach
Ablach
Ach
Acher
Adelbach
Aich
Aid
Aischbach, tributary of the Kinzig
Aischbach, tributary of the Körsch
Aitrach, tributary of the Danube
Aitrach, tributary of the Iller
Alb, tributary of the Rhine at Eggenstein-Leopoldshafen
Alb, tributary of the Rhine at Albbruck
Ammer
Amorsbach
Andelsbach
Annenbach
Arbach
Argen
Aschenbach
Aspenbach
Avenbach

B
Badische Eschach
Bära
Bellamonter Rottum
Berneck
Biber
Biberbach
Bibers
Black Kocher
Black Lauter
Blau
Blinde Rot
Bollenbach
Bottwar
Braunsel
Breg
Brehmbach
Breitenbach
Brenz
Brettach, tributary of the Jagst
Brettach, tributary of the Kocher
Brigach
Bronnbach
Brotenaubach
Brühlbach
Brunnisach
Buberlesbach
Buchbach
Buchenbach, tributary of the Lauter
Buchenbach, tributary of the Murr
Bühler
Burraubach

D
Dammbach
Dentelbach, tributary of the Murr
Dentelbach, tributary of the Steinach
Ditz
Dollesbach
Danube
Donaubach
Dreisam
Dürnach
Dürrbach
Dürrenbach
Dürreych

E
Echaz
Egau
Eger
Eisbach
Ellbach, tributary of the Kocher
Ellbach, heastream of the Rot
Ellbach, tributary of the Sulm
Elsach
Elsenz
Elta
Elz, tributary of the Neckar
Elz, tributary of the Rhine 
Enz
Epbach
Erf
Erlenbach, tributary of the Jagst
Erlenbach, tributary of the Enz
Erms
Ernsbach, tributary of the Kocher
Ernsbach, tributary of the Riedbach
Erpf
Württembergische Eschach
Eschach, headwater of the Aitrach
Eschach, tributary of the Neckar
Eselbach
Eselsbach
Ette
Ettenbach
Eyach, tributary of the Enz
Eyach, tributary of the Neckar
Eyb

F
Faulenbach
Federbach, tributary of the Alb
Federbach, tributary of the Lindach
Fehla
Felbenbach
Feuerbach
Fils
Finkenbach
Fischach
Fischbach, tributary of the Eschach
Fischbach, tributary of the Seckach
Flappach

G
Gauangelbach
Gauchach
Gillenbach
Ginsbach
Glatt
Glems
Glotter
Goldbach
Goldersbach
Gos
Göttelbach
Götzenbrunnenbächle
Grabenbach
Gronach
Große Enz
Grünbach
Grundbach
Grundelbach
Gruppenbach, tributary of the Bühler
Gruppenbach, tributary of the Schozach
Gutach

H
Hahnbach
Harmersbach
Hasenbach
Haslach
Heglach
Heidelsgraben
Heimbach
Hergstbach
Hergstgraben
Herrgottsbach
Heubach
Hintere Breg
Hirtenbach
Hochrhein
Höfelbach
Höllbach
Holzbach
Hörschbach
Hürbe

I
Ilgenbach
Irsbach
Itter
Iller

J
Jagst

K
Kalte Riss
Kaltenbach
Kämpfelbach
Kander
Kanzach
Kanzelbach
Katzbach
Katzenbach
Kehlbach
Kembach
Kessach
Kesselbach, tributary of the Danube
Kesselbach, tributary of the Zwiefalter Aach
Kinzig
Kirbach
Kirnach
Kirnau
Kirnbach, tributary of the Kinzig
Kirnbach, tributary of the Schiltach
Kleine Enz
Kleine Kinzig
Klemmbach
Klingenbach, tributary of the Bühler
Klingenbach, tributary of the Jagst
Klingengraben
Klöpferbach
Klotzbach
Knaupenbach
Kocher
Kochhart
Kochklingenbach
Körsch
Kötach
Kotbach
Krähenbach
Kraichbach
Krebsbach, tributary of the Schwarzbach flowing into the Elsenz
Krebsbach, tributary of the Würm
Kreuzbach, tributary of the Strudelbach
Kriegbach
Krumm
Krummbach, tributary of the Ablach
Krummbach, tributary of the Dreisam
Krummbach, tributary of the Steinhauser Rottum
Kübelbach
Kuhnbach
Kunzenbach
Kupfer

L
Langwatte
Lanzenbach, tributary of the Bühler
Lanzenbach, tributary of the Speltach
Lauchert
Lautenbach, tributary of the Ablach
Lautenbach, tributary of the Linzer Aach
Lauter, tributary of the Blau
Lauter, tributary of the Danube
Lauter, tributary of the Fils
Lauter, tributary of the Murr
Lauter, tributary of the Neckar
Lauterbach
Leimbach
Lein, tributary of the Kocher
Lein, tributary of the Neckar
Leudelsbach
Lierbach
Lindach
Lindenbach
Linzer Aach
Lobbach
Lone

M
Main
Maisenbach
Maulach
Mettenbach, tributary of the Grabenbach
Mettenbach, tributary of the Erlenbach which is a tributary of the Enz
Metter
Mettma
Metzgerbach
Miesach
Möhlin
Monbach
Moosalb
Moosbach
Muckenseebach
Mud
Mühlbach, tributary of the Fichtenberger Rot
Mühlbach, tributary of the Schussen
Murg, flows through the Northern Black Forest, tributary of the Upper Rhine
Murg, flows through the Southern Black Forest, tributary of the High Rhine
Murr

N
Nagold
Nassach
Nau
Neckar
Nesenbach
Nesselbach, tributary of the Bühler
Nesselbach, upper part of the Rombach
Neumagen
Nonnenbach

O
Obere Argen
Obere Bära
Ohrn
Oos
Ostrach
Otterbach

P
Pfannenbach
Pfedelbach
Pfeffer
Pfinz
Pfostenbach
Pfühlbach
Prim

R
Radolfzeller Aach
Rankbach
Rauentalbach
Rechenberger Rot
Reichenbach
Reichenbächle, tributary of the Breg
Reichenbächle, tributary of the Schiltach
Reißenbach
Rems
Rench
Reutenbach
Reutibach
Rhine
Riedbach
Rimbach
Rinderbach
Ringgenbach
Riss
Röhlinger Sechta
Rohrach
Rohrbach
Rohrhaldenbach
Rombach
Rot, tributary of the Danube
Rot, tributary of the Kocher
Rot, tributary of the Wurzacher Ach
Rotach
Rotbach, tributary of the Riss
Rotbach, headstream of the Dreisam
Rötelbach, tributary of the Danube
Rötelbach, tributary of the Jagst
Rötenbach, tributary of the Fichtenberger Rot
Rötenbach, tributary of the Kocher
Rotenbach, tributary of the Jagst
Rötenbach, tributary of the Kinzig
Rotenbach, tributary of the Rems
Red Kocher
Rotklingenbach
Rottum

S
Saalbach
Salinenbach
Sall
Salzach
Sanzenbach
Saubach, tributary of the Dürnach
Saubach, alternative name of the Stadtseebach
Sauerbach, headstream of the Aal
Sauerbach, headstream of the Avenbach
Schaich
Schandtauber
Schefflenz
Scherzach
Schießbach, tributary of the Bühler
Schießbach, tributary of the Nagold
Schiltach
Schleifseebach
Schlichem
Schlücht
Schmerach
Schmerbach
Schmiddis
Schmiebach
Schmiech
Schmiecha
Schmiehe
Schneidheimer Sechta
Schönbach
Schönertsbach
Schöpfebach
Schozach
Schussen
Schutter
Schwarza
Schwarzach, tributary of the Danube
Schwarzach, tributary of the Schussen
Schwarzbach, tributary of the Klingengraben
Schwarzbach, tributary of the Elsenz
Schwarzenbach, tributary of the Obere Argen
Schwarzenlachenbach
Schwippe
Seckach, tributary of the Jagst
Seckach, tributary of the Lauchert
Seerhein
Seltenbach
Sendener Bach
Siechenbach
Sindelbach, tributary of the Jagst
Sindelbach, headstream of the Körsch
Speltach
Spitzbach
Springe
Stadtseebach
Starzel, tributary of the Neckar
Starzel, tributary of the Prim
Stehbach
Steina
Steinach, tributary of the Neckar in Neckarsteinach
Steinach,  tributary of the Neckar in Nürtingen
Steinbach, tributary of the Bühler
Steinbach, tributary of the Jagst
Steinhauser Rottum
Steinlach
Stille Musel
Stiller Bach
Stockacher Aach
Stockerbach
Strudelbach
Sulm
Sulzbach, tributary of the Rhine
Sülzbach, tributary of the Sulm
Sulzbächle

T
Talbach, right tributary of the Ablach in Göggingen
Talbach, left tributary of the Ablach in Menningen
Tälesbach
Tannschorrenbach
Teinach
Tiefenbach, tributary of the Jagst
Tiefenbach, tributary of the Rems
Tierbach, headstream of the Ette
Tierbach, tributary of the Murr
Tobelbach
Trauzenbach
Tumbach
Tauber

U
Ulfenbach
Umlach
Umpfer
Untere Argen
Untere Bära
Upper Rhine
Urach
Ursentalbach
Urspring

V
Vogtsbach
Vorbach, a tributary of the Tauber at Rothenburg ob der Tauber
Vorbach, a tributary of the Tauber at Weikersheim

W
Wachbach
Wagensteigbach
Waldangelbach
Warme Riss
Weggentalbach
Wehra
Weiherbach, tributary of the Talbach at Memmingen
Weiherbach, tributary of the Schmiech
Weihung
Weißach, tributary of the Murr
Weißach, headstream of the Saalbach
Welzbach
Weschnitz
Westernach
White Kocher
White Lauter
Wiesaz
Wiese
Wild Gutach
Wildbach
Windischenbach
Windwiesenbach
Winterlauter
Wolf
Wolfegger Ach
Wollbach
Wulfbach
Würm
Wurzacher Ach
Wüstenbach
Wutach
Wieslauf

Z
Zaber
Ziegelbach
Zimmerbach
Zipfelbach, tributary of the Lindach
Zipfelbach, tributary of the Neckar
Zwiefalter Aach

 
Bade
Baden-Württemberg-related lists